Qualification for the 2012 United States Women's Curling Championship took place in one round in January in Marshfield, Wisconsin. The number of entrants to the national championships was cut down to ten teams through a challenge round.

Qualification System
Teams qualified for the women's nationals either by qualifying automatically as one of the top four teams on the World Curling Tour Order of Merit or by qualifying through the challenge round. The four teams that qualified automatically to the championships, an increase from last year's two teams qualified through the Order of Merit, were chosen based on the Order of Merit upon the conclusion of the Curl Mesabi Cash Spiel. This year, the teams are those skipped by Erika Brown, Rebecca Hamilton, Patti Lank, and Alexandra Carlson. The other six spots in the nationals will be awarded through competition in the challenge round.

The challenge round was held with the double knockout provision in place. The double knockout provision states that a team is eliminated from qualifying for the nationals if the team has at least two losses in their win-loss record. If there are teams with less than two losses, they will play each other until the number of teams still able to qualify matches the number of qualification spots available.

Challenge round
Since there are more than ten teams registered to the nationals this year, the teams that did not qualify directly for the nationals competed to earn one of six remaining spots in the nationals through the challenge round, which was held from January 19 to 22 in Marshfield, Wisconsin. The challenge round was held in a knockout format, as decided by the organizing committee. The teams that advanced from the challenge round were those skipped by Maureen Stolt, Cassandra Potter, Janice Langanke, Allison Pottinger, Aileen Sormunen, Kimberly Wapola.

Challenge round
The challenge round was held from January 19 to 22 at the Marshfield Curling Club in Marshfield, Wisconsin. It was held in a triple knockout format. Teams skipped by Maureen Stolt, Cassandra Potter, Janice Langanke, Allison Pottinger, Aileen Sormunen, and Kimberly Wapola advanced to the Nationals.

Participating Teams
The following is a list of all teams registered to participate in the regional qualifiers.

Knockout Brackets

A Event

B Event

C Event

Knockout results

Draw 1
Friday, January 20, 2:00 pm

Team Ellig was unable to field four registered players to start the competition, by rule an automatic forfeit.

Draw 2
Friday, January 20, 7:00 pm

Draw 3
Saturday, January 21, 9:00 am

Draw 4
Saturday, January 21, 2:00 pm

Draw 5
Saturday, January 21, 7:00 pm

Draw 6
Sunday, January 22, 8:00 am

Draw 7
Sunday, January 22, 1:00 pm

Draw 8
Sunday, January 22, 6:00 pm

References

2012 in curling
United States National Curling Championships
Qualification for curling competitions
Curling in Wisconsin